Nana 2 is a 2006 Japanese drama film directed by Kentarō Ōtani and adapted from the manga by Ai Yazawa. It is the sequel to the 2005 film Nana. Production for the movie began in mid-September and only one and a half month shootings finished the movie in time for the December 9, 2006 release.

Synopsis
Taking place shortly after the end of the first film, Nana 2 focuses more on Nana K. and her love life. Romance develops between Nana K. and Trapnest's bassist Takumi as well as with the Black Stones' guitarist Nobu. Meanwhile, Nana O. works hard for her band while trying to find happiness. Both girls struggle through life, and try to keep their friendship from falling apart.

Cast

Nana Osaki: Mika Nakashima
Nobuo Terashima: Hiroki Narimiya
Shinichi Okazaki: Kanata Hongo
Yasushi Takagi: Tomomi Maruyama

Nana Komatsu: Yui Ichikawa
Reira Serizawa: Yuna Ito
Ren Honjo: Nobuo Kyo 
Takumi Ichinose: Tetsuji Tamayama
Naoki Fujieda: Momosuke Mizutani

Kyosuke Takakura: Takehisa Takayama
Junko Saotome: Anna Nose
Shoji Endo: Yūta Hiraoka
Mr. Kawano: Seiichi Tanabe
Miss Sakagami: Rumi Shishido
Sachiko Kawamura: Saeko

Mizukoshi: Kazuma Suzuki
Natsuko Komatsu: Yoshiko Miyazaki
Yokoi: Tetsuhiro Ikeda
Satô Kôichi: Mickey Koga
Nami Komatsu: Natsuki Okamoto
Nao Komatsu: Mieko Kon'ya

Casting
Several actors who portrayed characters in the previous film did not return for Nana 2. Aoi Miyazaki declined to reprise the role of Nana Komatsu, and was replaced by actress Yui Ichikawa. Ryuhei Matsuda declined to play the role of Ren and was replaced with Nobuo Kyo. Kenichi Matsuyama, who portrayed Shinichi Okazaki, was replaced by Hongo Kanata.

Theatrical release

Even though both theme songs were released ahead ("Hitoiro" of Nana starring Mika Nakashima on November 29, 2006 and "Truth" of Reira starring Una Ito on December 6, 2006), the movie could only hit the #4 spot on the Movie Charts, from its release December 9, 2006 onward, and overall had very weak and low ratings. Many fans claimed that the exchange of main cast members led to the disappointing statistics.

On December 18, Nana 2 made its international debut in New York City, United States. New York - Tokyo brought the main actresses Mika Nakashima and Yui Ichikawa to the limited seated IFC Cinema. The movie was well received by fans.

Theme songs
Nana 2 once again featured the two artists Mika Nakashima and Yuna Ito, releasing songs under the names Nana starring Mika Nakashima and Reira starring Yuna Ito, respectively.

Nana, starring Mika Nakashima's new single "Hitoiro" featured Takuro of Glay as composer and Nana author Yazawa Ai as the lyricist again. It did not do as well as its predecessor "Glamorous Sky," peaking at only #5 on the Oricon charts. Two weeks after the release of the single, however, Nana starring Mika Nakashima released her first and last album, The End, which managed to rank at #2 on the Oricon charts.

Reira, starring Yuna Ito's "Truth" had no more luck than Nakashima's new single, ranking in only at the tenth place on the Oricon charts. The music video of the single was filmed in Scotland and used as scenes of the film. Neither of the singles were as record-setting as their predecessors.

External links
  (Japanese)
 NANA2 at JFDB
 

2006 films
2006 romantic comedy films
Films directed by Kentarō Ōtani
Films set in Japan
2000s Japanese-language films
Japanese romantic comedy films
Live-action films based on manga
New People films
2000s Japanese films

ja:NANA#NANA2